Hollister, Wisconsin is an unincorporated community located in the town of Wolf River, in Langlade County, Wisconsin, United States. The community is located on Wisconsin Highway 55. The village is named after Seymour W. Hollister, an Oshkosh lumberman and a partner in the Choate-Hollister Furniture Co.

References

Unincorporated communities in Wisconsin
Unincorporated communities in Langlade County, Wisconsin